The Tasmanian was a newspaper published in Launceston, Tasmania, Australia between 1871 and 1895.

Digitised editions from 1881 to 1895 are available via Trove.

See also 
 List of newspapers in Australia

References

External links 

 
 

Defunct newspapers published in Tasmania
Launceston, Tasmania
1871 establishments in Australia
1895 disestablishments in Australia